Minor league baseball teams were based in Hannibal, Missouri in various seasons between 1908 and 1955. Hannibal teams played as members of the Illinois–Missouri League in 1908, Central Association from 1909 to 1912, Illinois–Indiana–Iowa League from 1916 to 1917, Central Association from 1948 to 1949 and the Mississippi–Ohio Valley League from 1952 to 1955. The Mississippi-Ohio Valley League evolved to become the Midwest League.

Hannibal was a minor league affiliate of the St. Louis Browns in 1947 and 1948 and St. Louis Cardinals from 1953 to 1954.

Baseball Hall of Fame inductee and Hannibal native Jake Beckley managed the 1911 Hannibal Cannibals.

Hannibal, Missouri is the hometown of author Mark Twain, also known as Samuel Clemens, the namesake of the Hannibal baseball park: Clemens Field.

History
Hannibal teams played under a variety of monikers throughout their history. The first Hannibal minor league team was known as the Hannibal Cannibals, beginning play in the 1908 Illinois–Missouri League and continuing in the Central Association from 1909 to 1912. Baseball Hall of Fame member Jake Beckley played and managed for the 1911 Hannibal Cannibals. On August 25, 1911, Roy Brown of the Hannibal Cannibals pitched a no-hitter against the Monmouth Browns as Hannibal won the game 3–0.

The Hannibal Mules played as members of the Illinois–Indiana–Iowa League in 1916 and 1917.

After decades without hosting a minor league team, the Hannibal Pilots formed as members of the Central Association, playing in the league in 1947 and 1948.

Hannibal was an expansion team in the 1952 Mississippi–Ohio Valley League, the predecessor of the Midwest League. The 1952 Hannibal Stags, Hannibal Cardinals from 1953 to 1954 and Hannibal Citizens in 1955, were members of the Mississippi–Ohio Valley League. Hannibal pitcher Richard Lessman threw a no–hitter against the Lafayette Red Sox on August 9, 1955, in a 1–0 victory. After the 1955 season, the Hannibal franchise relocated to become the Michigan City White Caps for the first Midwest League season. Hannibal has not hosted another professional minor league team.

Through 2019, the Hannibal Cavemen and Hannibal Hoots of the collegiate summer Prospect League played at a renovated Clemens Field, which is also used for youth baseball.

The ballparks
Clemens Field, named for native Samuel Clemens, was built in 1938 as a Works Project Administration (WPA) Project and was home to the Hannibal teams thereafter. Clemens Field underwent a major renovation in 2009. today, the stadium has the original grandstand and brick wall perimeter, with a capacity of 2,500. Clemens Field is located at 403 Warren Barrett Drive, Hannibal, Missouri.

Previous to Clemens Field, the earlier Hannibal teams played at Mainland's Park (1910–1917), located on Market Street in the Oakwood neighborhood and League Park (1908–1909), located at the corner of Lyon and Glasscock Street, Hannibal, Missouri.

Timeline

Year-by-year record

Notable alumni

Baseball Hall of Fame alumni
Jake Beckley (1911, MGR) Inducted, 1971

Notable alumni
Al Bashang (1911)
John Castle (1917)
Oscar Fuhr (1917)
Gary Geiger (1954) 
Dan Kerwin (1910)
Joe Lutz (1947) 
Julio Navarro (1955)
Ollie O'Mara (1911–1912)
Hank Schmulbach (1947–1948)
Roy Sievers (1947) 5x MLB All-Star  1957 AL Home Run Leader; 1957 AL RBI Leader; 1949 AL Rookie of the Year
Cy Slapnicka (1909)  Cleveland Guardians Hall of Fame
Red Smyth (1912)
Clyde Southwick (1912)
Hack Spencer (1910)
George Stutz (1917)
John Wyatt (1954) MLB All-Star
Charlie Young (1917)

See also
Hannibal Cannibals playersHannibal Cardinals players
Hannibal Mules playersHannibal Pilots players

References

Hannibal, Missouri